The Euclid Company of Ohio was a company that specialized in heavy equipment for earthmoving, namely dump trucks, loaders and wheel tractor-scrapers. It operated in the US from the 1920s to the 1950s, when it was purchased by General Motors. It was later purchased by Hitachi Construction Machinery.

History

Founding
The Euclid Company of Ohio specialized in specifically designed off-road heavy haulers, compared to other companies that modified on-road trucks for off-road earth-hauling.

The Euclid Crane and Hoist Co., formed in 1909 and owned by George A. Armington and his 5 sons, became a large, respected and profitable operation by the early 1920s. The Euclid Crane and Hoist Co., introduced the Euclid Automatic Rotary Scraper in 1924 - soon followed by the Euclid Wheeler (wheeled) scraper. These earth-moving products were conceived by George's eldest son, Arthur, who steered the company into the earth-moving field. The two models of scrapers were successful, and a third model, the Euclid Contractors Special, designed to cope with hard ground, was even more successful. In 1926, the Armingtons formed Euclid Inc., the Road Machinery Division of Euclid Crane and Hoist, to cater especially to the off-road hauler market.

Arthur and his father George had built a successful prototype crawler, and tested it on the family farm, but the crawler design was dropped, for reasons unknown. Large public works construction programs in 1927 and 1928 required large excavations, thus enhancing the success of the Euclid Road Machinery division.

Euclid produced crawler wagons on tracks (similar to Athey Wagons) known as Euclid Tu-Way haulers. The crawler track speed restriction was a problem; the next version used steel wheels for improved speed. George Armington Jr was a keen hydraulics designer, and produced the first hydraulic Euclid dumpers circa 1930.

Great Depression
The Great Depression did not affect Euclid greatly, and the expansion of the earth moving portion of the Euclid business led to the incorporation of the Euclid Road Machinery Co, on July 11, 1931. This company remained a subsidiary of Euclid Armington Corp, until January 1, 1933, when the companies were separated. Euclid Road Machinery became a producer of fast, off-road earthmoving haulers.

It was powered by a 100HP Waukesha gasoline engine. It used a specially-designed, extremely heavy duty, Euclid rear axle, fitted with a new 17.5 x 24 tire, which had just been released by the tire industry.

The next Euclid design was an articulated, tractor/trailer style (in the style of the Caterpillar DW10), bottom dumper. This was known as the Model Z or ZW.

Company expansion
Euclid produced thousands of off-road haulers and scrapers, of improving and larger design and became a large international corporation by the early 1950s. In 1950 a separate UK-based company, Euclid Great Britain, was established. A factory specialising in off-road haulers was opened in Motherwell, Scotland. In 1953 the Euclid Corporation was purchased by General Motors, in what the leaders of both companies saw as an advantageous deal, with complementary product lines.
This deal came about due to GM's desire to enter the earthmoving manufacturing field and the realisation by the Armington family, that a GM takeover would provide capital and enhanced design capability. The GM takeover deal was announced on September 30, 1953, with an official takeover date of January 1, 1954.

Arthur Armington died suddenly in 1937, leading to a stumble in Euclid's fortunes. George Armington died in 1954, at the age of 89, after overseeing the sale of Euclid to GM. Sons Stuart & Everett Armington retired in 1953, and George Jr retired in 1958. The youngest son Ray, the last Armington, retired in 1960 after seven years as General Manager of GM's Euclid Division.

The 1950s and 1960s were good years for Euclid Trucks. Euclid produced the industry's first 50-ton, 3 axle dump truck, with twin Cummins power, in 1951. Euclid produced two and three axle dump trucks with capacities up to 105 tons in this period. Some of the largest three axle units, being used as tractors for even larger end dumps, and bottom dump haulers.

Antitrust lawsuit
In 1959 the Department of Justice under Attorney General William P. Rogers initiated an antitrust suit, under the Clayton Act, against General Motors Corporation. It charged that GM was too dominant, and its business methods stifled competition in the off-road hauler and earthmoving market. GM fought the suit for eight years, finally surrendering in 1968, agreeing to sell the Euclid Division.

After the sale of Euclid to White Motor Corporation, GM formed the Terex brand. Under the sale agreement with White, GM was not allowed to produce trucks in competition with White for 4 years – from July 1, 1968, to July 1, 1972. GM could produce off-road haul trucks in this period, but could not sell them in the US. GM equipment dealers in the US were offered a franchise deal from White to sell the White/Euclid line of trucks for a period of 4 years. The international Euclid dealerships were still owned by GM, thus forcing White to form all-new international dealerships. GM produced haul trucks in the 1968-1972 period that it had developed during its ownership of Euclid from plants in Canada and Scotland, that it had been allowed to keep. These were sold as Terex, but were essentially the same as the Euclid line.

The Euclid Company lost its prominence after the sale to White, and never achieved the standing that it enjoyed before the GM acquisition.

Current state
After the company was purchased by Hitachi Construction Machinery Co. Ltd. it is now producing a range of models of truck under the Hitachi name (although it is commonly branded as a Euclid, and several components bear the Euclid name). There are two classes of the machines that are currently in production: both are "rigid dumper" models (dump trucks with a rigid frame, non-articulated). The smaller construction and quarry trucks (30 ton - 90 ton) are dwarfed by the larger mining trucks in the 140ton - 450ton range.

Production was moved from Euclid, Ohio, to Guelph in Ontario, Canada. The trucks are modern and are equipped with mufflers and computer controllers to meet environmental requirements for sound and exhaust emissions.

There are some trucks currently in use in mines in the US, they can be seen in Canada at Fort McMurray, and throughout China, Australia, Africa, Indonesia and South America as well. Although the heady days of American needs for infrastructure have diminished, there is still much need for infrastructure and mining.

Smaller construction trucks, of 32 tons and 36 tons capacity, are being built in India by Telcon, a joint venture between Tata and Hitachi Construction Machinery Co. Ltd. from Japan.
These smaller trucks are of older technology - they were previously manufactured in Poland under license from VME (Volvo Michigan Euclid). The intended market for these older technology construction trucks is India.

White sold Euclid, Inc., to Daimler Benz AG of Stuttgart, Germany in August, 1977, and in January 1984, Daimler-Benz sold Euclid to one of Euclid’s former competitors, Clark Equipment Company, and it became part of the Clark Michigan Company, as Clark’s construction machinery division was then called. The following April, Clark formed a 50/50 joint venture with Sweden’s Volvo AB, now known as Volvo Construction Equipment to manufacture Volvo, Michigan and Euclid construction equipment under the name of VME Group NV. VME underwent several rather confusing divisions amongst its American and European operations, culminating in 1991 in the creation of a VME North Americas unit to handle only the Euclid lines.

In December 1993, VME North America entered into a joint venture of its own with Japan’s Hitachi Construction Machinery Co. Ltd., called Euclid-Hitachi Heavy Equipment. Hitachi Construction Machinery Co. Ltd., a manufacturer of hydraulic construction machinery like excavators and cranes, gradually increased its share of the joint venture until it owned 100% of the venture in 2000. 
Hitachi obtained Euclid to fill the gap which existed in their ability to offer a complete mining package, as mining excavators and dump trucks are usually needed in combination.

Euclid-Hitachi became Hitachi Construction Truck Manufacturing on January 1, 2004, and the famous Euclid green was replaced with Hitachi orange. The Euclid name was phased out by the end of 2004, ending 80 years of the Euclid name on construction machinery.

Developments

The Euclid company of Euclid, OH, was synonymous with off-road haul trucks, and earthmoving equipment such as bottom dumpers, and to a lesser extent, scrapers, in the 1950s. As described in Herbert L. Nicholas' "Moving the Earth", now in its 5th edition, Euclid was everywhere.

GM's work on heavy duty automatic transmissions during the Second World War had produced the Allison heavy duty automatic in 1945. Euclid was the first to use this transmission in heavy duty off-road dump trucks in the late 1940s. It met the need for an industrial transmission with huge power capacity, as engine sizes were increasing to the point where transmissions could not cope with the power.

Euclid had pioneered the use of twin engines (Twin-Power) in a bottom dumper (model 50FDT-102W), in November 1948. Their first Twin-Power scraper prototype (model 51FDT-13SH) appeared in February 1949, and production model Twin-Power scrapers were released in 1950 (GM powered model 68FDT-17SH - and the Cummins powered model, 66FDT-16SH). Prior to GM's purchase of Euclid, the engine preferred by Euclid was Cummins diesels, with GM's 2-stroke Detroit Diesel offered as an option. When GM purchased Euclid, it led to dismay at Cummins, because of loss of an important customer. The takeover led to GM engines being the engine of choice, but the Cummins option was still available, although Cummins-engined trucks sold in lower numbers after the GM takeover.

Ranging from 10 to 62 ton capacity, these giants roamed strip mines, heavy construction sites and quarries worldwide. Euclid's end dumps reached 210 tons in capacity in the 1980s.

Euclid trucks were usually loaded by cable-operated crawler shovels and draglines of other manufacturers, but Euclid also developed mobile belt loaders to load its bottom dump trucks.

Euclid also pioneered the high speed tractor belly dumper. This combined an off-road tractor (with a fifth wheel) and a very large, up to 100-ton capacity, belly dump trailer. This machine, descended from bottom dump wagons drawn by crawler tractors, discharged its load through longitudinal gates in the bottom of the trailer. The first such trucks carried 13 cubic yards, but by the early 1960s capacities reached 110 tons.

Euclid also manufactured wheeled tractor scrapers, such as were invented by R. G. LeTourneau (later to become LeTourneau-Westinghouse, after the purchase of R. G LeTourneau, Inc. by Westinghouse Air Brake Company) and now almost singularly manufactured by Caterpillar. Euclid's tractor scrapers were powered by the same tractors as their belly dumps. 
Euclid was the first major manufacturer to commercialize the now ubiquitous articulated rubber tired loader, the current mainstay of many heavy equipment manufacturers, particularly Caterpillar.

References

 Euclid Earth-Moving Equipment 1924-1968 (Orlemann, Eric C., MBI, 2004);
 Euclid and Terex Earth-Moving Machines (Orlemann, Eric C., MBI, 1997)
 The Earthmover Encyclopedia (Haddock, Keith, MBI, 2006).

External links

Euclid dumpers (at Volvo Construction Equipment) – includes sub-pages on 22 Euclid models, with photos and technical specs.
History of Hitachi Construction Equipment Europe - mentioning acquisition of Euclid 

Construction equipment manufacturers of the United States
Defunct truck manufacturers of the United States
Dump trucks
Haul trucks
Euclid, Ohio
Vehicle manufacturing companies established in 1924
General Motors marques
Hitachi
Volvo Group
1924 establishments in Ohio
Defunct manufacturing companies based in Ohio